Gomer Pyle, U.S.M.C. is an American situation comedy created by Aaron Ruben that originally aired on CBS from September 25, 1964, to May 2, 1969. The series was a spinoff of The Andy Griffith Show, and the pilot episode was introduced as the final fourth-season episode which aired on May 18, 1964. The show ran for five seasons, with a total of 150 half-hour episodes, 30 in black-and-white and 120 in color. Despite the series' positive reception (the show remained in the Top 10 Nielsen ratings for all five seasons), Nabors quit because he desired to move to something else, 'reach for another rung on the ladder, either up or down'. In 2006, CBS began releasing the show on DVD; the last season was released in November 2008.

Set in California (originally in North Carolina), it stars Jim Nabors as sweet-but-naive private Gomer Pyle, Frank Sutton as Gomer's hard-nosed and irritable sergeant Vince Carter, and Ronnie Schell as Pyle's best friend, Duke Slater. Though military-themed, the show never discussed the Vietnam War and instead focused on the relationship between Gomer and Sergeant Carter. The series is episodic in format; self-contained plots play out before the episode concludes.

Series overview

Episodes

Pilot (1964)

The pilot was an episode of The Andy Griffith Show.  "No. overall" and "No. in season" for the pilot indicate the airing and location of the episode within the parent series.
The pilot was shot in black-and-white.

Season 1 (1964–65)
All 30 episodes in black-and-white

Season 2 (1965–66)
All episodes from Season 2 onwards filmed in color

Season 3 (1966–67)

Season 4 (1967–68)

Season 5 (1968–69)

References

Lists of American sitcom episodes
The Andy Griffith Show